Tropidoturris is a genus of sea snails, marine gastropod mollusks in the family Borsoniidae.

Description
The biconical shell shows spiral lirae, with or without strong axial ribs. The protoconch contains 1½ - 2 smooth whorls. The distinct shoulder angle is usually very strong and crenellated by axials (when present). The columella shows a thin callus but no pleats. The outer lip is thin. The anal sinus is deep and wide. The small, translucent operculum has an oblanceolate shape and a terminal nucleus.

Distribution
This marine species is endemic to south-eastern Africa

Species
 Tropidoturris anaglypta Kilburn, 1986
 Tropidoturris fossata (Sowerby III, 1903)
 Tropidoturris planilirata Kilburn, 1986
 Tropidoturris scitecosta (Sowerby III, 1903)
 Tropidoturris simplicicingula (Barnard, 1958)
 Tropidoturris vizcondei Morassi & Bonfitto, 2013

References

External links
 
 Bouchet, P.; Kantor, Y. I.; Sysoev, A.; Puillandre, N. (2011). A new operational classification of the Conoidea (Gastropoda). Journal of Molluscan Studies. 77(3): 273-308

 
Gastropod genera